The Abada railway station in the Indian state of West Bengal, serves Abada, India in Howrah district. It is on the Howrah–Kharagpur line.

History
The Howrah–Kharagpur line was opened in 1900.
Bengal Nagpur Railway opened to traffic its main line from Nagpur to Asansol in 1891. Sini, on the Nagpur–Asansol line, was connected to Kharagpur and Kolaghat in 1898–99. The Kharagpur–Cuttack section was also opened the same year. The Kolaghat–Howrah track was completed in 1899–1900. Kharagpur was connected to Howrah with the opening of the Rupnarayan bridge on 19 April 1900.[11]

The Panskura–Durgachak line was opened in 1968, at a time when Haldia Port was being constructed. It was subsequently extended to Haldia. Haldia Dock Complex, a part of Kolkata Port Trust, was commissioned in 1977.[11][12]

The Tamluk–Digha line was opened in 2004.[13]

Tracks
The Howrah–Panskura stretch has three lines.

Electrification
The Howrah–Kharagpur line was electrified in 1967–69.

The Howrah–Kharagpur line was electrified in 1967–69. The Panskura–Haldia line was electrified in 1974–76. Santragachi–Bankaranayabaj sector was electrified in 1984–85. All lines were electrified with 25 kV AC overhead system.[14] EMU train services between Panskura and Haldia introduced in 1976 and direct EMU services between Howrah and Haldia in 1979.[11]

Passenger movement
Abada railway station handles around 6 passengers every day.

References

External links
 Trains at Abada

Railway stations in Howrah district
Kolkata Suburban Railway stations